The 2011 Southwest blackout, also known as the Great Blackout of 2011, was a widespread power outage that affected 
the San Diego–Tijuana area, southern Orange County, Imperial Valley, Mexicali Valley, Coachella Valley, and parts of Arizona. It occurred on Thursday, September 8, 2011, beginning at about 3:38pm PDT, and was the largest power failure in California history.

Background

At the time of the 2011 blackout, San Diego Gas & Electric (SDG&E, a subsidiary of Sempra Energy) was connected to Arizona by the Southwest Power Link, which is a single 500 kV power line (the next year, SDG&E completed a second line, the 500 kV Sunrise Power Link which was under construction during the event but still, it only parallels the Southwest Power Link and connects back to it at Imperial Valley; the remaining section into Arizona is still a single line). There is no other interconnection at the 500 kV level between SDG&E and other adjacent utilities. Rather, SDG&E is interconnected to Southern California Edison (SCE) by Path 44, a set of five separate 230 kV transmission lines which are all supplied through the switchyard of San Onofre Nuclear Generating Station (SONGS). Imperial Irrigation District (IID) has a 92 kV sub-transmission system connected to both.

Events

Due to a mistake by a technician, a 500 kV line between Arizona Public Service's Hassayampa substation near the Palo Verde Nuclear Generating Station in Tonopah, Arizona, and the North Gila substation in Yuma, Arizona was accidentally shut down. This transmission line is part of the Southwest Power Link. With the line shut down, the 500 kV Southwest Power Link went from San Diego to Yuma, AZ but was not supplied by anything else.

APS estimated a quick reconnection. However, the line opening had caused a large phase difference in the grid and the line could not be connected until the next day.

Most of the power to the San Diego area was then rerouted through Southern California Edison's system through San Onofre Nuclear Generating Station's (SONGS) switchyard. At this point SDG&E's system was taking more power from Southern California Edison than it could supply through SONGS' switchyard.

Imperial Irrigation District's sub-transmission system also ended up transferring a portion of the power between Southern California Edison's Palo Verde-Devers 500kv line and San Diego Gas & Electric's 500kv Southwest Power Link. In less than a minute, two transformers at IID's Coachella Valley Substation overloaded and disconnected. This caused severe low voltage on Imperial Irrigation District's system. Several minutes later, another transformer tripped off, causing the bulk of IID's system to be disconnected from Southern California Edison to the north. This caused drastic voltage problems which resulted in a loss of about half of IID's load as well as some generation.

Similar transformer overloads caused the Yuma area to be disconnected from WALC's system. The only supply to Yuma was now a backfeed from San Diego and Imperial Valley through the remainder of the 500 kV Southwest Power Link. One more transmission line tripped off, which was the last connection east of SONGS, between WALC's system to the north and SDG&E's system, CFE's system, and the Yuma area to the south.

What remained of the IID system had only one connection, the S-line to the remnants of the 500 kV Southwest Power Link at Imperial Valley Substation. This line overloaded as well. Instead of just cutting that line, their scheme commanded two generators in Mexico to go off-line. This did not have the intended effect as they were going off of incorrect information, and only exacerbated the problem. The line proceeded to trip, and most of IID's remaining load was lost.

All the power to the San Diego, Baja California, Mexico, and Yuma, Arizona regions was now being drawn from Southern California Edison through SONGS' switchyard. This draw was very high (around 170%), and a "safety net" system, the SONGS Separation Scheme, operated and disconnected 230 kV lines going into San Diego. SDG&E's system, CFE's Baja California system, and APS's Yuma service area were now completely separated from the Western Interconnection. This island had insufficient generation and rapidly spun down. Load shedding throughout this system operated rapidly, but some generation was still lost. In seconds, San Diego, Mexico, and Yuma, Arizona broke into three islands—all of which then collapsed.

Both units at SONGS also shut down, although this had no effect.

Effect
Five utilities were affected: SDG&E, serving San Diego County and parts of southern Orange County and Riverside County; Imperial Irrigation District, serving the Imperial Valley; the portion of Comisión Federal de Electricidad (CFE), Mexico's electric utility, serving Baja California; Arizona Public Service (APS); and the Western Area Power Administration's Lower Colorado system (WALC). The blackout left nearly seven million people without power, including 1.4 million customers in San Diego County and 1.1 million customers in Mexico.  The outage was the result of 23 distinct events that occurred on 5 separate power grids in a span of 11 minutes. Federal, regional and local officials investigated what happened and why the outage cascaded the way it did. APS's North Gila Substation reported power loss at 3:27 pm PDT. Within seconds a portion of a Mexico power plant shut down, but there was no indication that Arizona impacted Mexico. Units 2 and 3 at SONGS automatically tripped offline due to a "grid disturbance" which initiated the plant's Emergency Feed Actuation System (EFAS).

The hardest hit region of the blackout, the San Diego-Tijuana metropolitan area, was essentially brought to a standstill. Surface streets became gridlocked due to the loss of traffic signals, and the San Diego skyline went dark. The San Diego Trolley system was shut down as there was no power to operate trains and related functions. Citizens in Tijuana and in inland areas like the Coachella Valley stayed outdoors late into the night to escape the heat. Freeways in the Southern California megalopolis experienced extreme clogging, especially on the I-5 and I-15 corridors between southeastern Greater Los Angeles and the San Diego area's North County. One hospital was left without power for two hours when its backup generator failed. Blythe in the Palo Verde Valley was reportedly not affected by the outage.

Aftermath
Eleven hours after the outage began, power was restored to 694,000 of the affected customers, and by 4:30 am on September 9, power was restored to all customers, although the system was still described as "fragile". As a precaution, all public schools in San Diego County and the Capistrano Unified School District in southern Orange County were closed on September 9.  Most major universities and community colleges, as well as all federal courts in San Diego, closed for the day as well.

The outage caused significant losses to restaurants and grocery stores, which were forced to discard quantities of spoiled food; perishable food losses at grocery stores, eating establishments and households were estimated at $12 million to $18 million. The outage also caused some sewage pumping stations to fail, resulting in contaminated beaches and potentially unsafe water supplies in several areas. As a precaution, in some neighborhoods, residents were told to boil their water or use bottled water for several days after the outage. Due to the failure at the sewage pumping stations, diesel generators were installed at five pumping stations.

Question of association with terrorism
The outage occurred days before the tenth anniversary of the September 11 attacks, and hours before the United States Department of Homeland Security warned of a potential terrorist attack leading up to the anniversary. Consequently, a first reaction to the blackout was to wonder if the blackout might be the result of an attack. However, the Federal Bureau of Investigation and SDG&E ruled out terrorism early in their investigation, and no subsequent evidence was found to suggest that the outage was anything other than accidental.

Analysis

On April 27, 2012, the US Federal Energy Regulatory Commission and the North American Electric Reliability Corporation issued a joint report analyzing the technical details of the blackout and gave 27 findings and recommendations to prevent a recurrence. The report found problems in operations planning and situational awareness.

Some of the findings are:

The event showed that the system was not in an "N-1" state. Utilities are required to operate the system so that the failure of one component will not cause instability, separation, or cascading failures.

Next-day plans largely did not match the system at the time. For example, some utilities had plans based on a "heavy summer" scenario. This is the worst case in terms of load, but it does not consider that several generating stations may be out of service for maintenance.

Components with a voltage of 92 kV, which is a large part of IID's system, were not included in simulations. The simulations included components with a voltage of 100 kV or higher. Typically, lower-voltage components (e.g. 69 kV) can be ignored.

Protection schemes were not considered in their effect on the bulk power system. These are supposed to be reviewed; in fact, some of them were not really considered in terms of their effects. The "S line" scheme was intended to protect one of IID's transformers, but in fact that transformer was not overloaded. The fact that it disconnected generation was not helpful, and without this the blackout would not have occurred. Also, the results of the SONGS separation scheme were not really considered. It was thought to be for an extreme case that was unlikely to really occur.

The report offers some comments on large phase-angle differences in the power grid and what can be done to detect and deal with such problems. According to their power flow simulations, it would have been difficult to reconnect the transmission line even with a significant shift in generation. In the event there was not sufficient time to fix things this way.

There is also included some comparison with the 2003 Northeast blackout. Many of the same factors contributed to both events.

FERC citations
FERC cited six entities for alleged standards violations: the Arizona Public Service, California Independent System Operator, Imperial Irrigation District, Southern California Edison, Western Area Power Administration, and Western Electricity Coordinating Council.

See also
1996 Western North America blackouts
California electricity crisis
Northeast blackout of 2003
Path 46, also called West of Colorado River, Arizona-California West-of-the-River Path (WOR)

References

Power outages in the United States
History of Southern California
2011 in Mexico
2011 in California
2011 in Arizona
September 2011 events in the United States
September 2011 events in North America